The  jay (Aphelocoma ultramarina) is a bird endemic to Mexico.

Description
It is a medium-large (~120 g) passerine bird similar in size to most other jays, with a blue head, blue-gray mantle, blue wings and tail, gray breast and underparts.  The sexes are morphologically similar, and juveniles differ only in having less blue coloration. The iris is brown and legs are black. It is most readily distinguished by the plain (unstreaked) throat and breast, and the mantle contrasting less with the head and wings.

Systematics
A 2011 decision by the American Ornithologists' Union Check-list Committee treats some populations of the Mexican jay as a separate species, called the Transvolcanic jay (A. ultramarina), based on diagnosable phenotypic differences in plumage and morphology, millions of years of genetic divergence, and no evidence for interbreeding with Mexican Jays. The Transvolcanic jay inhabits montane forest in the Transvolcanic Belt of central Mexico. Populations to the north retained the common name Mexican jay, but their Latin name changed to A. wollweberi because the Transvolcanic jay is the original A. ultramarina.

Footnotes

References
Chesser, R. Terry, Richard C. Banks, F. Keith Barker, Carla Cicero, Jon L. Dunn, Andrew W. Kratter, Irby J. Lovette, Pamela C. Rasmussen, J. V. Remsen, James D. Rising, Douglas F. Stotz, Kevin Winker. 2011. Fifty-second supplement to the American Ornithologists' Union Check-List of North American Birds. Auk 128(3):600-613.

Aphelocoma
Jays
Birds of Mexico
Birds described in 1825
Taxa named by Charles Lucien Bonaparte
Birds of the Sierra Madre Occidental
Birds of the Trans-Mexican Volcanic Belt